Bykovka is a rural locality (a village) in Gorod Vyazniki, Vyaznikovsky District, Vladimir Oblast, Russia. The population was 152 as of 2010.

Geography 
Bykovka is located 5 km west of Vyazniki (the district's administrative centre) by road. Vyazniki is the nearest rural locality.

References 

Rural localities in Vyaznikovsky District